Huozhong (惑众) meaning "Tricks", is the debut album from Guntzepaula. It was released on 27 Jun 2014 in Taiwan.

Track List

Awards 
2014 Golden Indie Music Awards - Best Rock Album - HUOZHONG

2014 Golden Indie Music Awards - Best Musician of the Year (Bass - Tze)

References

2014 albums
Guntzepaula albums